The 1988 Senior League World Series took place from August 15–20 in Kissimmee, Florida, United States. Pingtung, Taiwan defeated Maracaibo, Venezuela in the championship game.

Teams

Results

References

Senior League World Series
Senior League World Series
1988 in sports in Florida